Genevieve "Jennie" Hayek Robak (May 4, 1932 – January 3, 2014) was an American politician who was a member of the unicameral Nebraska Legislature.

Robak was born in Surprise, Nebraska and graduated from Ulysses High School. After her marriage, she moved to Lincoln, Nebraska and then to Columbus, Nebraska, where her husband practiced law. A Democrat, Robak served in the non-partisan Nebraska Legislature from 1989 until 2003. She was killed in an auto accident in Lincoln, Nebraska. One of her children, Kim M. Robak, was the Lieutenant Governor of Nebraska.

References

1932 births
2014 deaths
People from Butler County, Nebraska
People from Columbus, Nebraska
Women state legislators in Nebraska
Democratic Party Nebraska state senators
Road incident deaths in Nebraska
Politicians from Lincoln, Nebraska
21st-century American women